The Ringarooma River is a perennial river located in the north-east region of Tasmania, Australia.

Location and features
The Ringarooma River rises below Mount Maurice and flows generally east by north, joined by ten tributaries including the Maurice River (Tasmania), Dorset, Cascade, Weld, and Wyniford rivers. In the lower reaches of the river, the topography comprises a floodplain and forms part of the Ramsar Lower Ringarooma River wetland. The river reaches its mouth and empties into the Tasman Sea at the Ringarooma Bay. The river descends  over its  course.

The Tasman Highway crosses the river on multiple occasions as part of its course.

See also

References

Rivers of Tasmania
North East Tasmania